Lesotho competed at the 2004 Summer Olympics in Athens, Greece, from 13 to 29 August 2004. It was the last time the nation competed under a former flag.

Athletics

Lesotho athletes have so far achieved qualifying standards in the following athletics events (up to a maximum of 3 athletes in each event at the 'A' Standard, and 1 at the 'B' Standard).

Men

Women

Key
Note–Ranks given for track events are within the athlete's heat only
Q = Qualified for the next round
q = Qualified for the next round as a fastest loser or, in field events, by position without achieving the qualifying target
NR = National record
N/A = Round not applicable for the event
Bye = Athlete not required to compete in round

Taekwondo

One Lesotho taekwondo jin qualified for the Olympics through a tripartite invitation.

References

External links
Official Report of the XXVIII Olympiad

Nations at the 2004 Summer Olympics
2004
2004 in Lesotho sport